Mekhi Leacock-McLeod (born 15 September 1996) is an English professional footballer who plays as a midfielder for Haringey Borough. He played in the Football League for Accrington Stanley.

Career
In June 2017, McLeod signed for Accrington Stanley on a one-year deal. Two months later he made his league debut for Accrington Stanley coming off the bench for Tom Dallison in a 3–2 loss against Yeovil Town. He was released by Accrington at the end of the 2017–18 season.

On 22 July 2018, he signed for National League side Halifax Town. After only eight appearances, he was released in January 2019, and later that season played for Welling United, VCD Athletic and Coggeshall Town. McLeod joined Romford in November 2019. He later joined Haringey Borough in December 2020.

References

External links
 
 

1996 births
Living people
Association football midfielders
Fulham F.C. players
Wolverhampton Wanderers F.C. players
Rangers F.C. players
Ware F.C. players
VCD Athletic F.C. players
Eastleigh F.C. players
Billericay Town F.C. players
Accrington Stanley F.C. players
FC Halifax Town players
Welling United F.C. players
Coggeshall Town F.C. players
Romford F.C. players
Haringey Borough F.C. players
English Football League players
National League (English football) players
Isthmian League players
English footballers